Aloa Union is a union of Bhuapur Upazila, Tangail District, Bangladesh. It is situated 27 km north of Tangail.

Demographics

According to Population Census 2011 performed by Bangladesh Bureau of Statistics, The total population of Aloa union is 27500. There are 6760 households in total.

Education

The literacy rate of Aloa Union is 42.9% (Male-45.6%, Female-40.5%).

See also
 Union Councils of Tangail District

References

Populated places in Dhaka Division
Populated places in Tangail District
Unions of Bhuapur Upazila